De Caluwé, or Decaluwé, is a surname. Notable people with the name include:

People
Carl Decaluwé (born 1960), Belgian politician
Edgard De Caluwé (1913-1985), Belgian cyclist
Ingrid de Caluwé (1967-), Dutch politician
Jackie De Caluwé (1934-2021), Belgian footballer
Katleen De Caluwé (1976-), Belgian sprinter
Robby De Caluwé (1975-), Belgian politician
Sylvie De Caluwé (1986-), Belgian model

See also
Tom Caluwé (1978-), Belgian footballer

Surnames of Belgian origin
Surnames of Dutch origin